Jayam Manade is a 1986 Indian Telugu-language action drama film written by Paruchuri Brothers and directed by K. Bapayya. The film stars Krishna, Sridevi and Rao Gopal Rao, and was released on 10 April 1986.

Cast 
 Krishna as Pinnamaneni Bose Babu
 Sridevi as Kanakamahalakshmi
 Rao Gopal Rao as Jodugulla Basavappa
 Prabhakar Reddy as Kondaiah
 Kaikala Satyanarayana as Subbaiah
 Giribabu as Chinnababu
 Nutan Prasad as Varadarajulu
 Allu Ramalingaiah as Doubt Ramaswamy
 P. L. Narayana as Venkatanarayana
 Kanchana as Savithri
 Annapoorna as Rajeshwari
 Ranganath as Ravindra
 Narra Venkateswara Rao as Public Prosecutor
 Chalapathi Rao as Sobhanadri
 Sarathi
 Mada
 Rajyalakshmi as Jyothi
 Eswar Rao as Sekhar
 Dubbing Janaki

Music 
The soundtrack album comprising 5 songs was composed by Chakravarthy. Veturi Sundararama Murthy penned the lyrics.
 "Ya Cheere Kattukonu" — P. Susheela, Madhavapeddi Ramesh
 "Govulanti Dhanni Ra" — P. Susheela, Madhavapeddi Ramesh
 "Rani Vasala" — K. J. Yesudas, P. Susheela
 "Pattu Ollu Pattu" — P. Susheela, Madhavapeddi Ramesh
 "Okkariki Okaru" — Madhavapeddi Ramesh, P. Susheela

Sources 
"Jayam Manade"

References

External links 
 

1986 films
1986 action films
Indian action films
Films directed by K. Bapayya
Films with screenplays by the Paruchuri brothers
Films scored by K. Chakravarthy